Maurice Vidal Portman (21 March 1860 – 14 February 1935) was a British naval officer, who is best known for documenting several Andamanese tribes between 1879 and 1901 when he was posted as a superintendent of the Andaman Island Penal Colony.

Life and career
Portman was born in Canada, the third son of Maurice Berkeley Portman and Helen Vidal Harris. His father was in turn the third son of Edward Portman, 1st Viscount Portman, and Emma Portman, Baroness Portman. He joined the Royal Indian Marine at the age of 16 and was some time in charge of the Viceroy's yacht.  In July 1879 he was stationed at Port Blair in the Andaman Islands and made Officer in Charge of the Andamanese, a post which he held for more than 20 years with few interruptions (including December 1880 to December 1883 on sick leave, March 1887 to March 1888 on furlough).

Port Blair 

During his time as a colonial administrator at Port Blair, Portman took a large number of photographs of the Andamanese, including some at the request of British Museum (at his own expense) and the Government of India (on payment). Portman also undertook an expedition to North Sentinel Island to contact the previously uncontacted tribe inhabiting the island. During the expedition, the Sentinelese fled at the sight of the expedition, though his party kidnapped two adults and four children, taking them to the capital of the South Andaman Island, Port Blair. The adults died of illness soon after reaching Port Blair, and Portman ordered the children to be sent back with a large number of gifts after a few weeks.
The illness carried by the returning children, who had acquired them in Port Blair, has been suggested by some as the cause of the hostility displayed by the Sentinelese towards outsiders.
During his time as a colonial administrator, Portman noted the devastating impact outside diseases, such as smallpox, had on the Andamanese. 

Portman continued to take photographs of the Andamanese in Port Blair until the end of his stay in the island, documenting information about their anthropological details, showing a marked interest in measuring the penises of the Andamanese.
A significant portion of his photography involved posing the Andamanese in mock-Greek homoerotic compositions. Portman repeatedly praised the male Andamanese body, writing that "many of the men are very good-looking; as they have none of the thick lips, high cheekbones, and flat noses of the negro type; though the women are rather of the Hottentot Venus order of beauty". 
The plates made by Portman are now scattered among several museums around the world and may be partly unpublished.  He also wrote two books, Notes of the Languages of the South Andaman Group of Languages (1898) and A History of Our Relations with the Andamanese (1899). Portman also composed a significant collection of ethnographic objects during his time on the Andaman Islands that are now in the collections of the British Museum.

Later life
His obituary stated that he had a "frail physique" and suffered from ill health.  After retiring as an invalid in 1901, he went back to Britain where he did some journalism and "some valuable Secret Service work" during World War I. He was a member of the Union Club. He never married and left no descendants.

References

External links
 
13-volume collection of photos held at the British Library: Andamanese Islanders (1893): Volume I; Volume II; Volume III; Volume IV; Volume V; Volume VI; Volume VII; Volume VIII; Volume IX; Volume X; Volume XI; Volume XII; Volume XIII (Portman Collection)

1860 births
1935 deaths
People from Axbridge
Royal Indian Navy officers
Andaman and Nicobar Islands
Maurice Vidal
Linguists